The birdwing pearlymussel (Lemiox rimosus) is a rare species of freshwater mussel in the family Unionidae, the river mussels. This aquatic bivalve is native to Tennessee and Virginia in the United States. Its range has declined over 90%. It is a federally listed endangered species of the United States.

This mussel remains in three rivers in Tennessee and Virginia, the Duck, Clinch, and Powell Rivers, having been extirpated from many more. It is now extinct in the state of Alabama.

Failed efforts to transplant the birdwing pearly mussel and the Cumberland monkeyface pearly mussel, also endangered, to local streams brought an end to construction on the half-completed and long-contested Columbia Dam on the Duck River in 1983.

References

Natural history of Tennessee
Natural history of Virginia
Lemiox
Bivalves described in 1831
Taxa named by Constantine Samuel Rafinesque
ESA endangered species
Taxonomy articles created by Polbot